The Greensburg-Salem High School (GSHS) is a public high school which is located in Greensburg, Pennsylvania, in the United States.

Greensburg-Salem High School is the only high school in the Greensburg-Salem School District, which is situated thirty-five miles east-southeast of Pittsburgh in the center of Westmoreland County. It covers an area of fifty-one square miles that includes urban, suburban and rural populations.

For 2022, U.S. News & World Report ranked GSHS 11,118th best of 17,843 U.S. public high schools, 435th best of 718 Pennsylvania public high schools, and 78th best among 132 Pittsburgh-area public high schools.

Curriculum 
GSHS students who wish to choose a vocational or technical program may attend Central Westmoreland Career and Technology Center in New Stanton.

Extracurricular activities

Athletics
In addition to academics, Greensburg-Salem fields several sports teams.

Boys

Girls

Notable alumni

References

See also
Official web site

Public high schools in Pennsylvania
Schools in Westmoreland County, Pennsylvania
Greensburg, Pennsylvania